Cameron Roigard (born 16 November 2000 in New Zealand) is a New Zealand rugby union player who plays for the  in Super Rugby. His playing position is scrum-half. He was announced in the Hurricanes squad as a late replacement in the side for Round 7 of the 2021 Super Rugby Aotearoa season. He also represented  in the 2020 Mitre 10 Cup.

Reference list

External links
itsrugby.co.uk profile

2000 births
New Zealand rugby union players
Living people
Rugby union scrum-halves
Counties Manukau rugby union players
Hurricanes (rugby union) players